The Utah Lake sculpin (Cottus echinatus) is an extinct species of freshwater ray-finned fish belonging to the family Cottidae, the typical sculpins. This species was endemic to Utah Lake, located in the north-central part of the U.S. state of Utah. The last collected specimen was taken in 1928, and the species is believed to have disappeared during the 1930s, when a severe drought led to a rapid fall in water levels in the lake. A cold winter led to the lake freezing, resulting in the overcrowding of the remaining fish. This, along with decreased water quality from agricultural practices, has been identified as the likely cause of extinction.

The Utah Lake sculpin was a benthic species (bottom dwelling), invertebrates constituting its major source of food. It was one of two lake-dwelling sculpins native to Utah, the other being the Bear Lake sculpin.

References

Utah Lake Sculpin. Utah Conservation Data Center.

Cottus (fish)
Freshwater fish of the United States
Fish of North America becoming extinct since 1500
Extinct animals of Utah
Fish described in 1963
Taxa named by Reeve Maclaren Bailey